Grantham is a market and industrial town in the South Kesteven district of Lincolnshire, England, situated on the banks of the River Witham and bounded to the west by the A1 road. The population in 2016 was put at 44,580. The town is the largest settlement and the administrative centre of South Kesteven District.

Grantham was the birthplace of the UK Prime Minister Margaret Thatcher. Isaac Newton was educated at the King's School. The town was the workplace of the UK's first warranted female police officer, Edith Smith in 1914. The UK's first running diesel engine was made there in 1892 and the first tractor in 1896. Thomas Paine worked there as an excise officer in the 1760s. The villages of Manthorpe, Great Gonerby, Barrowby, Londonthorpe and Harlaxton form outlying suburbs of the town.

Etymology
Grantham's name is first attested in the Domesday Book (1086); its origin is not known with certainty. The ending -hām is Old English and means "homestead". The first part of the name may either be the personal name Granta or derive from the Old English word Grand (gravel), implying either "Granta's homestead" or "homestead by gravel". In the early 20th century, the town's name was still pronounced Grant-m or Grahnt-m; but as people moved more frequently and became more literate, they began to derive the place name from its spelling and the pronunciation shifted to Granthum (the t and h becoming a th phoneme). This was already becoming common in 1920, and the later pronunciation is now the norm.

Geography

Grantham is a town in the South Kesteven district of Lincolnshire, a non-metropolitan county in the East Midlands of England. Until 1974 it was a borough, but it is now unparished and bounded by the civil parishes of Great Gonerby to the north-west, Belton and Manthorpe to the north, Londonthorpe and Harrowby Without to the north-east and east, Little Ponton and Stroxton to the south, Harlaxton to the south-west, and Barrowby to the west. Its urban area is almost entirely within the unparished area, though The Spinney housing estate, Alma Park industrial estate and part of the Bridge End Road housing estate are in Londonthorpe and Harrowby Without.

Topography and geology
The town lies in the valley of the River Witham, its core at the Witham's confluence with the Mowbeck (or Mow Beck). The Witham flows south–north through Grantham.

The floor of the Witham valley – 50–60 m above sea level in the town centre – is underlain by mudstone of the Charmouth formation of the Lower Jurassic period (199–183 million years ago). This formation is overlain by Belton sand and gravel laid down in estuaries and rivers in the Quaternary period up to 3 million years ago. The river courses are overlain by Quaternary alluvium and to the north by river terrace deposits. The soil around the route of the Witham is wet, acidic, sandy and loamy; its fertility is poor.

As the ground rises on the town's eastern and southern fringes, it is underlain by Jurassic Marlstone rocks of ferruginous sandstone and ironstone formed 190–174 million years ago, and then by Whitby Mudstone of 174–183 million years ago. The land rises sharply to form the Lincoln Cliff that marks the edge of the urban area and start of the Lincoln Heath and Kesteven Uplands, which are capped by Jurassic Oolitic Limestone, mostly overlain by shallow, free-draining, lime-rich soils.

To the west, the town is near the edge of the low-lying Vale of Belvoir but fringed by an escarpment rising in places to over 100 m to form the hills on which sit Barrowby, Great Gonerby, the Green Hill and Earlesfield suburban areas and the business parks off Trent Road. These hills are of siltstone and mudstone of the Jurassic Dyrham Formation, which line the edges of the Witham and Mowbeck valleys and the shallow valley of Barrowby Stream. At its highest the scarp is capped by Jurassic ferruginous sandstone and ironstone rocks of the Marlstone formation. There are some head deposits and pleistocene glaciofluvial deposits of sand and gravel east of Barrowby. The soil in the lower areas is slowly permeable, seasonally wet and slightly acidic, though base-rich. On higher ground it tends to be slightly acidic and base-rich, but freely draining and highly fertile.

Grantham Canal, which opened in 1797, closely follows the route of the Mowbeck from Echo Farm into the town. West of there it cuts through a valley north of Harlaxton into the Vale of Belvoir, eventually reaching West Bridgford near Nottingham.

Urban area

The historical core of Grantham is bounded by Westgate, Brook Street and Castlegate, and includes the High Street down to St Peter's Hill. This is the town's main retail and commercial area. It includes many historic buildings. Between Westgate and the A52 to the west are postwar retail buildings and blocks of flats. North of it is 18th, 19th and 20th-century suburban housing focused on North Parade, which include villas and terraced housing. Further north, off Gonerby Road and Manthorpe Road (A607), these give way to large, low-density, suburban, privately owned housing on estates mostly built in the 1970s and 1980s. Those at the base of Gonerby Hill are known as Gonerby Hill Foot and lie west of the railway line, to the east of which developments are contiguous with the historical core of Manthorpe village.

South of the town centre, suburban housing takes the form of late-Victorian and Edwardian brick, terraced and villa houses in grid-plan layouts, initially built for industrial workers and now largely owned or let privately. Alongside some housing in Harlaxton Road (A607), most of these streets cluster round the railway station and nearby retail and industrial units in an area known as Spittlegate (also spelled Spitalgate or Spittalgate), the town cemetery – an area called New Somerby in older maps – and the Wharf Road, London Road and Bridge End Road stretches of the A52. Further south-east, low-density, mostly privately owned, suburban housing estates of the 1970s and 1980s cluster round the A52, marking the edge of the town's urban area. Further east, off the A52, are the Prince William of Gloucester Barracks.

The north-east fringe of the urban area is marked by 20th-century development. An exception is a piece of land east of the Witham and north of Stonebridge Road that includes schools and colleges and portions of a 19th-century barracks complex south of greenspace, including Wyndham Park. Otherwise the area between the Witham, Belton Lane, Londonthorpe Lane and the Lincoln Cliff has suburban housing, mostly privately owned with some let by housing associations. It includes part of the Harrowby Estate, begun in 1928 as council housing). The part round Belton Lane and Harrowby Lane is a low-density mix of pre-First World War, interwar and postwar houses; the remainder of the large estate and the Cherry Orchard Estate appeared in the immediate postwar period in medium density, on a layout inspired by the Garden City movement. South of Londonthorpe Lane and north-east of the other estates are medium and high-density housing areas dating largely from the 1970s to the early 21st century; The northernmost, known as The Spinney or Sunningdale, adjoins the post-war Alma Park industrial estate off Londonthorpe Lane.

The town's western fringe sits between the railway line, the A1 bypass and the Kesteven Uplands. North of the canal are large, varied developments mostly from the 20th century, including the Earlesfield estate, begun as a council estate in the 1920s and expanded in the postwar period, industrial estates, and a leisure centre complex, all south of Barrowby Stream, by the expansive 1980s estate on Green Hill, the Edwardian and Victorian villas lining Barrowby Road, and the large 1980s and 1990s estate to its north. Most of this is privately owned, but some is let by housing associations. The canal basin is lined with industrial, warehouse, retail and office buildings that continue up to Dysart Road. South of them are Harlaxton Road (A607) and Springfield Road, round which separate residential developments have been built, including inter-war homes in Huntingtower Road, a 21st-century estate centred on Hudson Way, post-war social housing at Walton Gardens, post-war housing Denton Avenue, and late-20th-century developments at Harris Way.

Climate
The British Isles experience a temperate, maritime climate with warm summers and cool winters.

Prehistory
Much of Grantham's early archaeology lies buried beneath the modern town, making it "difficult to unravel". Early prehistoric hunter-gatherers visited the area. Scattered Stone Age tools have been found, the earliest being a Palaeolithic axe on the Cherry Orchard Estate, dating between 40,000 and 150,000 years ago. The next earliest material consist of Mesolithic flints crafted 4,000 to 8,000 years ago and found round Gonerby Hill and the riverside in the south of the town. Neolithic people probably settled in the Grantham area for its proximity to the rivers and its fertile soils; material suggesting settlement in this period has been found at Great Ponton. Other scattered finds have been unearthed around the town. Remains of a Neolithic ritual site on the parish boundary between Harlaxton and Grantham are known from aerial photography. Bronze Age artefacts include pottery vessels, with human remains found in Little Gonerby, a Beaker pot, Beaker pottery sherds, cinerary urns and a food vessel, and a later cemetery at Belton Lane, but there is little direct evidence of Bronze Age settlement in the area of the modern town. Little is known about it in the Iron Age, though ditched enclosures and a field system of this date are known to lie off Gorse Lane.

Various Romano-British coins and pottery finds have emerged in Grantham; a burial and pottery from the 2nd century AD were uncovered off Trent Road in 1981. Small settlements or farmsteads from the period have been discerned on the hills overlooking Grantham from the east, and another has been found in Barrowby. There were probably Romano-British farmsteads on the site of the modern town, but the wet soils round the Mowbeck and flooding by the Witham probably made it hard for a larger settlement to grow there. Three kilometres to the south of the modern town, an important Roman site has been found at Saltersford, a crossing of the River Witham near Little Ponton. Extensive finds and evidence of a significant Romano-British occupation have emerged in the vicinity since the 19th century; it has been tentatively identified by some scholars as Causennae, mentioned in the Antonine Itinerary, and sat at the place where River Witham was crossed by the Salter's Way, a trade route connecting the salt-producing coastal and marshland regions with the Midlands. Salter's Way may also have crossed Ermine Street (now B6403) at Cold Harbour, 4 km south-east of Grantham. Saltersford may have been a small town with a market for local farmsteads and smaller settlements.

Medieval town

Origins
The local historian Michael Honeybone has "no doubt that the town of Grantham was established during [Anglo-]Saxon times"; its name suggests it emerged in the earliest phase of Anglo-Saxon settlement, probably by the 7th century. The archaeological evidence for this is limited to finds indicating cemeteries at the sites of the Central School in Manthorpe and the junction of Bridge End Road and London Road in the town, and to small quantities of pottery sherds found on London Road, Belton Lane, Saltersford, New Somerby and Barrowby.

The town's Saxon-period history is obscure and debated. The medievalist Sir Frank Stenton argued that Grantham probably emerged as an "important estate centre" before the Viking invasions in the 9th century and then functioned as a "minor local capital" in the Danelaw. By contrast, the historian David Roffe has argued that the town and its outlying soke were established in the 1040s or 1050s by Queen Edith and Leofric, Earl of Mercia, to strengthen their hands in the county at the expense of Siward, Earl of Northumbria. They may have also created St Wulfram's Church either as a new place of worship or as one revived from a possible earlier cell of Crowland Abbey. Roffe argues that Siward's death in 1055 made Grantham's new role less important; as such, its soke only grew to its full extent after the Norman Conquest of England, when the king merged it with the soke of Great Ponton. Whatever its origins, by the time of the Domesday Book (1086, the earliest documentary evidence for the settlement), Grantham was a town and royal manor; under its jurisdiction fell soke comprising lands in 16 villages. St Wulfram's served this extended parish area.

Royal manor
Grantham's Domesday entries show it as an estate centre, where Queen Edith had a hall before 1066. Twenty years later, the king had the manor; there were four mills and eight acres of meadow, but no arable land. The demesne appears to have been land now known as Earlesfield in Great Gonerby. There were 111 burgesses and 72 bordars, possibly labourers or craftsmen, indicating that Grantham was both a manor and a borough where the lord retained exclusive rights. It was a valuable asset, used by the king to reward loyal followers. By 1129, the manor and soke had been granted to Rabel de Tancarville, the king's chamberlain in Normandy. He sided against King Stephen during The Anarchy (1135–1154) and his lands were probably forfeited on his death in 1140, although restored to his son William and confirmed in the early 1180s. The king retook the manor after William's heir Ralph de Tancarville failed to support him in Normandy.

In 1205, the king granted it to his ally William de Warenne, 5th Earl of Surrey. It was held as a life interest and reverted to the Crown on his widow's death in 1249, but regranted to his son the 6th earl in 1266. On his death in 1304 it reverted to the crown and was soon granted to Aymer de Valence, but had been regranted to Warenne's grandson, the 7th earl, by 1312. Four years later it was resettled on the 7th earl for life with reversion to the crown. William de Bohun, 1st Earl of Northampton was granted the reversion in 1337 and took seisin ten years later. After his death, it reverted again to the Crown and in 1363 Edward II granted it to his son Edmund of Langley, Duke of York, through whose heirs it passed to Richard of York, 3rd Duke of York, a major figure in the Wars of the Roses and rival of Henry VI. After Richard's death in 1460, Henry's Queen Margaret of Anjou attacked Grantham in 1461, but later that year was defeated by Richard's son Edward, who took the throne as Edward IV. Two years later, Grantham was rewarded for loyalty to the Yorkist cause when the king granted the borough a charter of incorporation, as a self-governing council – the Corporation of Grantham headed by an Alderman – with various freedoms.

Economy and government

Its lords encouraged Grantham to expand as a commercial centre. By the late 11th century it was an "important market town". The wool trade prospered, benefiting from its proximity to grazing lands on the Lincoln Heath. This wealth contributed towards the building of St Wulfram's Church. Wool shops were in Grantham in 1218 and Walkergate (now Watergate) was recorded in 1257, indicating the presence of fullers (walkers), who played a role in processing wool. Cloth manufacture declined around this time, but wool continued to be produced for trading, primarily for export from Boston. Wool merchants are recorded from the town in the late 13th century (foremost being was Roger de Belvoir, who contributed over £296 to the Wool Prize of 1297). By this time merchants from Italy, Saint-Omer and Amiens were active in the town.

In 1269, the earl granted the town free tronage – the right to weigh wool without paying a toll. Less than 30 years later, its merchants were asked to send a representative to counsel the king. The wool trade boomed in the early 14th century; the town's merchants traded at least 980 sacks of wool at Boston during Edward II's reign, half from the de Chesterton family. In 1312, the earl granted the burgesses various freedoms and the right to elect a leader (the Alderman), codifying a longstanding informal arrangement. Later in the century the king sought to raise revenues by taxing the wool trade; some Grantham merchants, including the wealthy Roger de Wollesthorpe, acted as creditors to the king.

England's falling population, continued taxation of wool exports and the growth of cloth exports and monopolisation led to the wool trade declining by the mid-15th century. Cloth exports became more important nationally. Grantham had a small cloth industry, but it could not compete with new fulling mills, which required fast-flowing water. Its merchants continued to trade in wool and it remained a dominant aspect of the town's economy. Other industries also existed during the Middle Ages; there is evidence of wine trading, brewing, parchment making, weaving and other trades and crafts.

The bridging of the River Trent at Newark by the late 12th century realigned the Great North Road so that it passed through Grantham, bringing traffic to the town as an important stopping place and leading to the development of inns such as The George and The Angel. By the 16th century, the economy was diverse. The largest sector was the leather trade, employing a quarter of the known workforce; distribution, food, drink and agricultural trades were also important. By that time, clothing and textiles each accounted for less than 10 per cent of the town's workers.

Modern history

19th and 20th centuries
The Lincoln Theatre Company of actors took a 21-year lease on the theatre in 1800.

The town developed when the railway came. The Nottingham Line (LNER) arrived first in 1850, then the London line (GNR) – the Towns Line from Peterborough to Retford – arrived in 1852. The Boston, Sleaford and Midland Counties Railway arrived in 1857.

Gas lighting appeared in 1833. The corporation became a borough council in 1835. Little Gonerby and Spittlegate were added to the borough in 1879. The town had been in the wapentake of Loveden and included three townships of Manthorpe with Little Gonerby, Harrowby and Spittlegate with Houghton and Walton.

Grantham Golf Club, now defunct, was founded in 1894 and continued until the onset of the Second World War.

Until the 1970s, the housing estates west of the town centre were green fields. Green Hill, on the A52, was literally a green hill. In July 1975 the National Association of Ratepayers' Action Groups (NARAG) was formed in Grantham by John Wilks, its chairman, as a forerunner of the TaxPayers' Alliance.

Military history

The town has a long military history since the completion of the Old Barracks in 1858.

Dambusters
During the Dambuster Raids Royal Air Force missions in May 1943, the RAF Bomber Command's No. 5 Group and operation HQ were in St Vincents, a building later owned by Aveling-Barford and housing a district council planning department. It was built by Richard Hornsby in 1865 and lived in by his son. It is now a private house. In 1944 (including D-Day), it was the headquarters for the USAAF's Ninth Air Force's IX Troop Carrier Command, known as Grantham Lodge.

RAF Spitalgate
RAF Spitalgate trained pilots during both world wars, initially as a Royal Flying Corps establishment. It was the first military airfield in Lincolnshire. It has never been an operational fighter or bomber base; although it did see operational service during the 1943 invasion of Europe as a base for American and Polish gliders and parachutists. It officially closed in 1974. The Women's Royal Air Force had been there from 1960 until closure. (as RAF Wilmslow was closing due to the imminent ending of National Service), and moved to RAF Hereford (now the home of SAS).

After closure, RAF Spitalgate became the Royal Corps of Transport, later Royal Logistic Corps barracks: Prince William of Gloucester Barracks, named after Prince William of Gloucester. Grantham College used the site's two football pitches for their South Lincolnshire Football Development Centre (from September 2004). After closure in 1975 a vehicle test centre was built on the outfield; this closed in 2011. The large mast on the base was part of the BT microwave network.

The Queen's Royal Lancers (part of the Royal Armoured Corps) have their RHQ on the base.

RAF Regiment
The RAF Regiment was formed north-east of the town in parts of Londonthorpe and Harrowby Without during December 1941 with its headquarters at RAF Belton Park, which is recognised as its birthplace. The Belton Park estate had been a training centre for the Machine Gun Corps from November 1915.

The RAF Regiment reached in excess of 66,000 personnel and during training was housed at RAF Belton Park, the Regiment's first depot, RAF Folkingham and RAF North Witham.

Women's police force
Grantham was first after London to recruit and train women police officers. It was the first provincial force to ask the newly formed Corps of Women's Police Volunteers to supply them with occasional policewomen, recognising them as useful for dealing with women and juveniles. In December 1914 Miss Damer Dawson, the Chief of the Corps, came to Grantham to supervise the preliminary work of the women police. Officers stationed there were Miss Allen and Miss Harburn. In 1915, Grantham magistrates swore in Edith Smith, making her the first policewoman in Britain with full powers of arrest.

Industrial history

Richard Hornsby & Sons
Richard Hornsby and Richard Seaman founded Seaman & Hornsby, Iron Founders and Millwrights, at Spittlegate in Grantham in 1810. The company was renamed Richard Hornsby & Sons when Seaman retired in 1828. Products included ploughs and seed drills.

From 1840 until 1906 the company built steam engines. Thereafter production shifted to oil, petrol and gas engines. It employed 378 men in 1878 and 3,500 in 1914.

In 1905 Richard Hornsby & Sons invented a caterpillar track for a machine using Hornsby's oil engines; these engines were developed by Yorkshireman Herbert Akroyd Stuart, from which compression-ignition principle the diesel engine evolved, being manufactured in Grantham from 8 July 1892. Although such engines were not wholly compression-ignition derived, in 1892 a prototype high-pressure version was built at Hornsby's, developed by Thomas Henry Barton OBE – later to found Nottingham's Barton Transport – whereby ignition was achieved solely through compression; it ran continuously for six hours as the first known diesel engine. In the town, Hornsby's built Elsham House, whose grounds became Grantham College) and the Shirley Croft. Its site in Houghton Road was bought from Lord Dysart.

In 1910 Hornsby presented its chain-track vehicle to the British Army, which then bought four caterpillar tractors to tow artillery. At the demonstration, a British transport officer suggested putting armour plating and a gun on a Hornsby tractor, so creating some sort of self-propelled gun. David Roberts, managing director of Hornsby, did not pursue the idea, but later expressed regret at not having done so. Four years later, Hornsby sold the patent for its caterpillar track to the Holt Manufacturing Company of California, USA, for $8,000, having itself sold only one caterpillar tractor commercially. The Holt system was superior to Hornsby's, but the Hornsby transmission was what Holt really wanted. Thanks in part to this acquisition, Holt eventually became the successful Caterpillar Inc. Tractor Company. In 1918, Hornsby's amalgamated with Rustons as Ruston & Hornsby. In the 1920s the company had its own orchestra in the town; the site was a diesel engine plant. During the Second World War, the company made tanks such as the Matilda at the Grantham factory. Ruston and Hornsby left in 1963 and most of the factory was taken over by a subsidiary, Alfred Wiseman Gears, which itself left in 1968.

Barford's
The agricultural engine and steamroller manufacturer Aveling and Porter of Rochester, Kent, merged with Barford & Perkins of Peterborough as Aveling-Barford Ltd in 1934, largely with financial help from Ruston & Hornsby, as both firms had entered into administration. The new company took a former site of Hornsbys, naming it the Invicta works, from the motto on the coat of arms of Kent, which translates as "unconquered"; all Aveling & Porter machinery was brought from Kent by rail.

During the 1970s Barford's was the town's largest employer, with around 2,000 employees. It initially prospered, but declined with the sinking market for large dumper trucks and road rollers. In 1947, its agricultural division, Barfords of Belton, developed the world's smallest tractor, the Barford Atom, weighing .

Now Barford Construction Equipment, it makes dumpers for construction sites, being owned by Wordsworth Holdings PLC, owned in turn by the entrepreneur Duncan Wordsworth until it went into administration in March 2010. A restructuring package resulted in ownership transferring to Bowdon Investment Group in May 2010. It is now known as Invictas Engineering.

A trailer company, Crane-Fruehauf, moved into part of the factory from its former home at Dereham, when it went into receivership in early 2005.

BMARC
British Manufacture and Research Company (British Marc Ltd or BMARC), in Springfield Road, made munitions, notably the Hispano cannon for the Spitfire and Hurricane from 1937 onwards. It was owned by the Swiss Oerlikon from 1971 until 1988, becoming part of Astra Holdings plc. The firm was bought by British Aerospace in 1992, which then closed the site. It has now been developed as a housing estate. The site's former offices are now business units for the Springfield Business Centre. Grantham's register office moved there in 2007.

Former developments
In 1968 Reads of Liverpool built a canning factory in Springfield Road to serve Melton Mowbray, becoming American Can, then Pechiney (French) in 1988, then Impress (Dutch). It closed in 2006 and was demolished in 2007 to make way for a housing estate. Ransome & Marles Bearing had a ball bearing factory in the town until 1957, when production was moved to Newark.

Mowbray and Co Ltd, a brewery, was bought by J. W. Green of Luton. It was founded in September 1828 and became a public company in 1880. It closed in 1967.

Economy
The food industry, together with Grantham Hospital, is currently the largest Grantham employer. Poultry production company Moy Park (formerly Padleys) is at Gonerby Hill Foot; GW Padley bought the site in 1977 from Wolsey, a former garment manufacturer. It acts as a poultry hatchery. Moy Park are owned by Marfrig of São Paulo, with Marfrig's European headquarters at Preston Deanery in Hackleton, Northamptonshire. Aviagen Turkeys also has a poultry hatchery further along the B1174 at Gonerby Moor. Brake Bros Ltd has a depot near the Gonerby Moor service station, off B1174.

Fenland Foods (part of Northern Foods) on the Earlesfield Industrial Estate, closed in September 2008 after losing business with Marks and Spencer, its sole customer. On Ellesmere Business park is Väderstad-Verken UK, its parent company based in Väderstad in Sweden and Tecknit Europe (makers of electromagnetic shielding equipment), owned from 2006 by Parker Hannifin based in Cranford, New Jersey.

One is Norbert Dentressangle, which bought Christian Salvesen plc in November 2007 and maintains the frozen storage and distribution operation which has been at the site since the late 1960s. The other is McCain Foods, which purchased Potato and Allied Services (PAS) in 1991, which had run a potato processing factory on the site since the early 1970s; it has since been extended. There was a third large frozen vegetable processing factory owned and operated by Christian Salvesen; it was sold to Pinguin Foods in August 2007, which closed the facility in December 2008.

GBS has been based in Grantham since May 1975, when known as Chatto, Bodley Head & Cape Services. Chatto & Windus had merged with Jonathan Cape in 1969. The former site was officially opened on 23 September 1975 by Michael Foot MP. Random House was formed in 1987 from a combination of book companies, and in 1990 the site became known as Grantham Book Services. The company won an award in 1992 from the British Book Awards. Next door to GBS and a Gala Bingo is Cathodic Protection, which with BGB Innovation won The Queen's Award for Enterprise: International Trade (Export) in 2009.

According to Super Output Area data from the ONS, the least socially deprived area in Lincolnshire is the ward of Stamford St John's; Grantham's least deprived ward (SKDC) is in the north-east of the town near the former Central School.

Hotels
Conference and hospitality facilities in the Grantham area include the Olde Barn Hotel in Marston, the Q-Hotel group Belton Woods Hotel, the Urban Leisure Hotel and various golf clubs. Stoke Rochford Hall won the Les Routiers Wedding Venue of the Year in 2011. The Griffin Inn at Irnham won the 2012 Les Routiers B&B of the Year Award. The Eden House Hotel is a historic building built as a mansion in about 1850.

Angel and Royal

The Angel and Royal in the High Street is widely regarded as the oldest surviving English inn. The façade of the main building as it appears today was built about 600 years ago, but the site had already held an inn for 200 years. It was originally a hostel for the Knights Templar. King John is reputed to have visited with his Royal Court in 1213. The inn was extended in the mid-14th century and again in the 15th century.

A visit by Richard III was the origin of the gold emblem angel holding the King's crown over the original archway. In 1483 Richard held court and it was from the "Chambre de' Roi", that he dispatched a letter bidding for the Great Seal to proclaim the treachery of his cousin, the Duke of Buckingham, leading to the signature of Buckingham's death warrant. Copies of the letter, the original of which is kept by the British Museum, are displayed adjacent to the Richard III lounge and the King's Room Restaurant.

King Charles I made use of the King's Room during his visit in 1633 and Oliver Cromwell also stayed at the Angel after his successful battle near Grantham in 1643. The cellars and foundations of the inn are reputed to date from the 9th century, and are rumoured to be linked by tunnels to both St Wulfram's Church and the town's Market Square. In 1707 the then landlord Michael Solomon died, but left a legacy of 40 shillings a year to pay for the preaching of a sermon, against the evils of drunkenness, for every Mayor.

The prime position of the inn on the Great North Road led to its long history as a coaching inn, which accounts for its characteristic layout, with long courtyard, old stables and entrances to front and rear. In 1800 six inns were listed in Grantham, together with 21 alehouses. The Angel's prosperity declined markedly with the coming of the railways.

By the middle of the 19th century, the Angel had also enjoyed the patronage of King George IV. In 1866 the then Prince of Wales visited Grantham, directly leading to the second part of the inn's name. In the early 1920s the word Inn was dropped and the building became a hotel.

After the Second World War, the hotel was purchased by Trust House Hotels, later to become Trust House Forte. It remained with Trust House until a few years ago. Since then there has been a succession of owners, including several brewery companies. In May 2002, the Angel and Royal was purchased by a consortium of local business professionals.

Closures
Brook Street and Hill Avenue sub-post offices were closed in Grantham in 2008 as part of the Post Office Network Change programme. In August 2010 it was confirmed that the Grantham branch of Marks and Spencer would close, with two other Lincolnshire branches in Skegness and Scunthorpe, due to low sales, although a Marks and Spencer Food Hall re-opened in 2014. The closure met with local protests. Discount department store chain Boyes took over the property in 2012. Haldanes, a chain of about 20 supermarkets based in Ruston Road, went into administration. The former HMRC office at Crown House in Castlegate closed in early 2010, moving to two sites in Lincoln.

Demography

Ethnicity and religion 
According to the 2011 census, Grantham's population was 96.3% white; 2.0% Asian or British Asian; 0.6% Black, African, Caribbean or Black British; and 0.9% mixed or mutli-ethnic; and 0.2% other. The population is therefore less ethnically diverse than England as a whole, which is 85.4% white; 7.8% Asian or Asian British; 3.5% Black, African, Caribbean or Black British; 2.3% mixed ethnicities; and 1% other. 90.1% of the town's population were born in the United Kingdom, compared with 86.2% nationally; 6.1% were born in European Union countries other than the UK and Ireland, of which almost three quarters (4.3% of the total) were born in post-2001 accession states; for England, the figures were 3.7% and 2.0% respectively. 3.4% of the population was born outside the EU, whereas the total for England was 9.4%.

In the 2011 census, 69.4% of Grantham's population said they were religious and 23.8% said they did not follow a religion, very similar to England as a whole (68.1% and 24.7% respectively). However, compared to England's population, Christians were a higher proportion of the Grantham population (67.6% compared with 59.4%), and all other groups were present at a lower proportion than the national rates. There were 20 Sikhs in Grantham, making up a negligible proportion of the population compared with 0.8% nationally; Hindus composed 0.5% (compared with 1.5% in England), Muslims 0.5% against 5% nationally, Jewish people 0.1% compared with 0.5% for all of England, and Buddhists 0.3% of the town's population, contrasting with 0.5% nationally.

Household composition, age, health and housing 

In the 2011 census, 48.5% of the population were male and 51.5% female. Of the population over 16, 47.2% were married, compared to 46.6% in England; 31.1% were single (a smaller proportion than in England where it was 34.6%), 10.9% divorced (compared with 9% in England), 7.3% widowed (slightly higher than the 6.9% for all of England), 3.3% separated and 0.2% in same-sex civil partnerships (2.7% and 0.2% respectively in England). In 2011, there were 17,944 households in the Grantham urban area. It had a slightly lower than average proportion of one-person households (28.8% compared with England's figure of 30.2%); most other households consisted of one family, which was more common in Grantham than England as a whole (65.3% of the total, compared with 61.8% in England). This was because there were slightly higher than average rates of cohabiting couples (12% compared with 9.8%), lone parent households (11.2% against 10.6%) and married couples (34.2% compared with 33.2%), but fewer people in multiple and other household types (5.9% compared with 8%).

The 2011 census showed the average age of Grantham's population to be in line with the national average; the mean age was 39.3 and the median 39 years, compared with 39.3 and 39 for England. 24.8% of the population was under 20, versus 24% of England's, and 22.4% of Grantham's population was aged over 60, compared with 22% of England's population. In 2011, 80.7% of the population were in good or very good health, compared to 81.4% in England, and 5.4% in very bad or bad health, exactly the same rate as in England. 18% of people (9.3% in 16–64 year-olds) also reported having their day-to-day activities limited, compared with 17.6% in England (8.2% in 16–64 year-olds).

As of 2011, Grantham had similar proportions of people who owned their homes with or without a mortgage (62.2%) than in England (63.3%) and who rented socially (17.1% compared with 17.7% nationally); there was a slightly higher rate of private renting (18.8% compared with 16.8%) while owner-occupiers were more likely to be mortgaged than in England as a whole (55.7% of them, compared with 51.8%). The proportion of household spaces which are detached or semi-detached houses is higher than average (27.8% and 33.6%, compared with 22.3% and 30.7%), while the proportion of households living in apartments, flats and maisonettes is much lower (13.1% against 22.1%). The proportion of terraced household spaces is similar (25.4% compared with 24.5%).

Workforce 

In 2011, 72.7% of Grantham's residents aged between 16 and 74 were economically active, compared with 69.9% for all of England. 65.6% were in employment, compared with 62.1% nationally. The proportion in full-time employment is also comparatively high, at 42.7% (against 38.6% for England). The proportion of retirees was in line with the national figure, at 13.9% compared with 13.7% for England, as was the proportion of long-term sick or disabled (3.9%, compared with England's 4%); 1.6% of people were long-term unemployed, compared with 1.7% in all of England. The 2011 census revealed that the most common industry residents worked in were: wholesale and retail trade and repair of motor vehicles (19.1%), manufacturing (13.9%), and human health and social work (12.9%). The latter category was in line with the national average, but retail and manufacturing were overrepresented compared with England (where the proportions were 15.9% and 8.8%, respectively). Most other industries were under-represented comparatively, with financial services (2.4% versus 4.4% nationally), information and communication (2.0% against 4.1% nationally), and professional, scientific and technical activities (3.9% compared with 6.7%) especially so.

Compared with the whole of England, the workforce had modestly higher proportions of people in elementary occupations (14.4% compared with 11.1%), process, plant and machinery operative roles (10.9% against 7.2%), skilled trades (12.8% versus 11.4%), and caring and other service occupations (10.5% against 9.3%). There was a much lower proportion of people in professional, associate professional, technical, administrative and secretarial occupations than in England as a whole (combined 32.6% versus 41.7% of England's population aged 16–74), principally driven by a lower proportion of full professionals (11.1% compared with 17.5%).

The proportion of residents aged 16 to 74 with no qualifications was 23.7%, only slightly higher than the national figure (22.5%); the proportion of residents whose highest qualification is at Level 1 or 2 (equivalent to GCSEs) is higher than in the national population, but 19.8% of Grantham's population have a qualification at Level 4 or above (Certificate of Higher Education upwards, including graduates), compared with 27.4% nationally.

Deprivation 
The government's Indices of Multiple Deprivation (2019) show that Grantham contains both dense pockets of deprivation and areas of substantial affluence. The county council note that high levels of deprivation in parts of the town contrast with the less deprived rural hinterlands around it. A statistical area covering part of the Earlesfield estate falls within the most deprived 10% of areas in the country; it is the most deprived place in South Kesteven. Other parts of Earlesfield and the Cherry Orchard suburb fall within the most deprived 20% of areas nationally, while much of the central urban area also falls below the national median and the top five most deprived areas in the district are all parts of Grantham. However, the Green Hill and Spinney housing estates and parts of Gonerby Hill Foot and Manthorpe fall within the least deprived decile nationally; one of them is in the least 10 deprived places in South Kesteven.

Transport

Rail

Grantham railway station is served by the London–Edinburgh East Coast Main Line, between Peterborough and Newark Northgate). It is joined by the Nottingham to Skegness Line (Poacher Line). Liverpool–Norwich trains also call at Grantham. Electric trains began running in October 1988. Transport links to Nottingham and Peterborough attract some commuters. The town's grammar schools also attract pupils from Radcliffe on Trent, Bingham, Newark and even Retford via the train. Grantham is the best-served station in Lincolnshire, although after October 1970, most of Lincolnshire's branch lines were closed. Before October 1970 the connection from King's Cross to Lincoln Central was through Grantham and followed the A607 via Leadenham. After that date, London-Lincoln trains still passed through Grantham, but then continued up the main line to Newark Northgate, where the trains branched off to Lincoln St Marks Railway Station via a new curve just north of Newark.

In 1906 a rail accident killed 14 people.

Road
The Great North Road was routed through the town in 1196. The turnpike to the north reached the town in 1725, that to Stamford in 1739, to Nottingham in 1758, and that to Melton in 1780.

The A1 main road from London to Edinburgh runs past the town, which was bypassed in 1962. The A52 linking Nottingham and the East Coast was diverted from High Street onto the Inner Relief Road, Sankt Augustin Way, in 1998. Wharf Road and London Road junction is still a busy junction on the A607 for Lincoln. Motorway-style Grantham North Services, at the north end of Grantham bypass, is on a new junction which replaced a roundabout in May 2008.

Grantham, with Stamford, had been earmarked for a bypass before the war in 1939. There were 60 serious accidents a year, with three to four deaths. After the war, on 21 November 1945, there was a meeting at the Guildhall about the proposed bypass of the London-Edinburgh-Thurso trunk road for Grantham and Great Gonerby. This was the first enquiry into a trunk road scheme in the country after the war. The proposed route followed the current line, from Little Ponton to College Farm, except it was to be a single carriageway road.

On 8 February 1960, it was announced that a bypass would be built, including the route south to the B6403 at Colsterworth. Robert McGregor and Sons Ltd of Manchester would build the road for £1,856,009. (The company went on to build Newark bypass in 1964.) The bridges were built by Simon Carves of Cheadle Hulme. It was formally opened on 10 October 1962 by James Heathcote-Drummond-Willoughby, 3rd Earl of Ancaster, then the Lord Lieutenant of Lincolnshire (from 1950 to 1975). He was married to the (only) daughter of Nancy Astor.

Various attempts at one-way systems in Grantham have been introduced, but traffic delays are still commonplace. Low railway bridges also add to traffic difficulties, with lorries becoming stuck under them. Many promises have been made by the local council for a Grantham bypass road. The latest, the Grantham Southern Relief Road, has been in planning since 2007. Phase one of the project was completed in 2016 which provided access to some commercial facilitates and a new roundabout on the B1174. Phase Two, started in October 2019, involves a new grade separated junction on the A1 and is due to be opened on the 20th December 2022. Phase three for the main stretch of road started in 2021 and due to be completed by 2023. In July 2022 it was found that ground conditions at a new viaduct were for as expected, and the project would be delayed as the viaduct would need to be redesigned.

Waterways
Grantham was once linked to Nottingham by the Grantham Canal. It is possible to walk and cycle along the canal starting from Grantham near the A1/A607 intersection (opposite The Farrier).

The River Witham runs through Grantham. It has a riverside walk linking Dysart Park and Wyndham Park, on which is a view of Spittlegate Mill. The walk passes Inner Street allotment and the rear of Sainsbury's car park, access to which is by a pedestrian bridge at the end of College Street. There are other footbridges with views of the river and its weirs. Swans, ducks and trout are among the wildlife that can be seen along the river.

Education

Grantham College, a further education college for the district, opened in 1948, for those not attending school sixth forms. It has a satellite site at Sleaford, Sleaford College. Since September 2008 the Walton Academy in Kitty Briggs Lane near Harlaxton Road has run post-16 courses as Grantham's only sixth form college. In September 2019, the school had its first intake of male students in the lower school, making the former all-girls school co-educational.

Two notable schools in the district are Kesteven and Grantham Girls' School and The King's Grammar School. Both have large sixth forms and eminent past students. Britain's first female Prime Minister, Margaret Thatcher, attended Kesteven and Grantham, and Isaac Newton famously attended The King's. Both have remained single-sex up to the age of 16.

In 1970, Kesteven County Council (based in Sleaford) announced plans to turn the grammar schools into co-educational comprehensives for ages of 11–16 and leave Grantham College the only sixth form for the town. Later it was proposed to create two sixth-form colleges from one of the grammar schools. Other parts of Kesteven became comprehensive but responsibility for education passed to Lincolnshire under the local government reorganization of 1974, and both schools stayed as grammar schools. Ex-pupil Margaret Thatcher was education secretary at the time. The governors of the King's School delayed the process in July 1973, and in January 1975 a plan to make Grantham comprehensive was voted against by the county council, having been approved by the council's own education committee.

On 1 August 2011 The King's School ended its long relationship with the local elected authorities and the town of Grantham, by converting to a selective academy. It remains a selective boys' school and has kept its name and logo.

All four secondary modern schools are on the outskirts of Grantham. Only three of the six secondary schools are co-educational.

The Priory Ruskin Academy (formerly Central Technology & Sports College) is a co-educational school sited near Manthorpe.

In Gorse Lane is Grantham Preparatory School, an independent school preparing entrants for the 11-plus examination. Another private primary school is Dudley House School. Near St Wulfram's on Castlegate is the National Church of England Junior School, built in 1859, and a feeder school for the town's grammar schools.

The Blessed Hugh More School, a Catholic secondary school, closed in 1989.

Governance

Grantham once lay within the ancient Winnibriggs and Threo wapentake in the Soke of Grantham in the Parts of Kesteven.

Politically the town belongs to the Grantham and Stamford constituency, represented in Parliament by Conservative Party Member of Parliament (MP) Gareth Davies, elected at the 12 December 2019 general election.

Two of Grantham's MPs in recent years, Joe Godber and Douglas Hogg, have been Secretary of State for Agriculture.

Before 1974, the local area was represented by Grantham Borough Council, based at Grantham Guildhall on St Peters Hill, and West Kesteven Rural District, based in Sandon Close. The local authority is now South Kesteven District Council.

The Grantham Charter Trustees have responsibility for ceremonial functions remaining from the former Grantham Borough Council. They include civic ceremonies, annual commemorative events, hosting official visits and maintaining the town's regalia. The Charter Trustees consist of the Grantham District Councillors on South Kesteven District Council. Two members of these are elected annually as Mayor and Deputy Mayor of Grantham.

The 2016 population, put at 44,580, divides by electoral ward into Belmont 4,900; Grantham Arnoldfield 4,666, Grantham Barrowby Gate 5,195, Grantham Earlsfield 6,557, Grantham Harrowby 4,770, Grantham St Vincent's 7,637, Grantham St Wulfram's 5,461, and Grantham Springfield 5,394.

Religious sites

Grantham has places of worship of various denominations. It is the second tallest church in Lincolnshire after St James' Church in Louth. It also holds England's first public library, dating from 1598, when Francis Trigge, rector of Welbourn, gave £100 for a small chained library of books for the clergy and literate laity of Grantham; 250 of the original volumes remain in a small room above the South Porch. From October 1974 the church was permanently floodlit at night.

The Anglican church in the New Somerby district, dedicated to St Anne and seating about 350, was erected as a mission church in 1884 and built of iron. A mission church, dedicated to St Saviour and seating about 150, was built of brick in the Little Gonerby district in 1884. The church of St John the Evangelist was built of stone in the Spittlegate district in 1840–1841. It seated about 1,100. Today the Deanery of Grantham still includes the churches of St Anne and St John the Evangelist amongst its 18 churches. The current suffragan Bishop of Grantham is Nicholas Chamberlain; his official residence is in Long Bennington.

The Catholic Church of St Mary the Immaculate stands in North Parade. Grantham Baptist Church is located in Wharf Road. Grantham Christchurch (LEP) Church (United Reformed Church) is located in Finkin Street. Harrowby Lane Methodist Church dates from the late 1920s. Finkin Street Methodist Church was a Wesleyan Methodist chapel built in the 1840s and attended by Margaret Thatcher.

Plans in 2014 to construct an Islamic cultural centre in the town created controversy, including protests from right-wing groups.

Culture and amenities

Amenities 
Wyndham Park has two children's play areas. There is an open-air paddling pool, football pitch and cafe. Dysart Park has a paddling pool and safe play area for children under six, a green for football and a bandstand. Indoor amenities for children include a swimming pool at the Meres Leisure Centre.

The public library is located in the Sir Isaac Newton Centre. On St Peter's Hill in the centre of town stands Grantham Museum and the Guildhall Arts Centre, which includes a 210-seat theatre.

Belton House is a popular National Trust site with events for children, a play area, train rides, picnic area and woodland walk.

Nature 

Grantham and its surrounding area host peregrine falcons, which have in recent years roosted in the bell tower of St Wulfram's Church. Grantham is surrounded by rolling countryside and woodland, such as nearby Ponton Park Wood, which has walks and views of woods and farmland. To the north-east there are the attractive gardens and the magnificent deer park of the National Trust's Belton House. Adjacent are Londonthorpe and Alma Park Woods, both owned by the Woodland Trust. The former comprises young woodland and open areas of wild flowers, while Alma Park has mature woodland on its steep limestone scarp and offers views over the town and the surrounding area.

To the south of the town, between Little Ponton and Saltersford, the River Witham flows through marshes and water meadows that support a variety of plant species, including vetches, cowslip, Primula veris, Lady's bedstraw Galium verum, and orchids, including the southern marsh orchid, and wildlife, including grey herons, mallards, greylag geese, water vole, and the now critically endangered white clawed crayfish. The area has notable populations of dragonflies, especially Aeshna grandis, Anax imperator, Libellula quadrimaculata and Calopteryx splendens, which are also found on Grantham Canal as it runs through The Vale of Belvoir to the west of the town. Wildlife can also be found in the town's Wyndham and Dysart Parks.

The Woodland Trust is based in Dysart Road and has been in Grantham since 1978; its new £6 million building, on the opposite side of the road, opened in November 2010. The building, designed by Atelier One and Max Fordham, has won several architectural awards.

Gingerbread biscuits 
The town is known for gingerbread biscuits, first made in 1740 by a baker, William Eggleston. He produced a biscuit called Grantham Whetstones. Whetstones were a rusk-like dry biscuit enjoyed locally and by coach drivers who would stop in Grantham to change horses while travelling along the Great North Road. According to folk belief, Egglestone was baking whetstones in his dimly lit kitchen one morning when he mistook one ingredient for another, resulting in a ginger-like biscuit to emerge from the oven. The mistake was a huge success and the biscuit became established as Grantham Gingerbread, known as a white gingerbread, as it is not made with molasses or black treacle. This has a delicate ginger flavour, rich in butter, with a domed top and a crackled surface. The centre is hollow like a honeycomb.

Media 
Grantham's local newspaper, the Grantham Journal, first went on sale in 1854 as The Grantham Journal of Useful, Instructive and Entertaining Knowledge and Monthly Advertiser. This was shortened to its current name a few years later. It was founded by Henry Escritt, a Yorkshireman by birth, who moved to the area in 1861. The 'Journal' is owned by Iliffe Media (formerly by Johnston Press), and has a sister newspaper in Melton Mowbray, the Melton Times. In the 1960s and earlier it produced the Melton Journal and Rutland Journal, both versions of the main paper. It also produces a Bingham edition.

David Wood CBE (1914–1990), former political editor of The Times (working under Sir William Haley), started out at the Grantham Journal.

There is a small FM radio transmitter near the town's bypass in Gorse Lane, from which BBC Lincolnshire and Lincs FM broadcast. Most television programmes are broadcast from Waltham, between Grantham and Melton, due to the line of sight to Belmont being blocked by hills to the east of the town.

Grantham also has a full-time community radio station, Gravity FM, which broadcasts from its own transmitter at The Maltings in Springfield Road and also online. Since redevelopment, the station has its own studios in Riverside Walk, on the western side of Grantham College. It is operated by local volunteers.

Sport

Football
Grantham Town Football Club, the local football team, currently plays in the Evo-Stik Northern Premier League. It was founded in 1874 and now uses the 7,500-capacity (covered 1,950, seats 750) South Kesteven Sports Stadium (although average attendances are well below that). The ground also doubles as the town's athletics stadium (one of only three in Lincolnshire), next to the Grantham Meres Leisure Centre on Trent Road.

Harrowby United F.C. in Dickens Road, near the Church of the Ascension, is in the UCL (United Countries League) Division One league.

Rugby Union
Kesteven Rugby Football Club was founded in 1947 and plays at Woodnook, off the B6403. It fields two men's teams, a ladies XV and many junior sides.

Hockey
Grantham Hockey Club, which fielded men's and women's team in league hockey, played at the Meres Leisure Centre, on an astro-turf pitch directly behind the football stadium. In 2011, the men ended a long spell in the Midlands League, moving to the East League, successfully earning promotion to Division 5 (North West). Their story is documented in 1,309 Days Later, the title a reference to a no-win spell between 2006 and 2009.

Bowls
Grantham bowls players have represented the indoor and outdoor clubs in county and national competitions. Indoor club players Martin Pulling, Dion Auckland, Ian Johnson, and former England U25 player Mathew Orrey, have played for the England squad.

Table tennis
In 1993 and 1994 international team matches were held in Grantham, at the South Kesteven Table Tennis Centre, which was opened in January 1992 by Johnny Leach. Grantham College have a Table Tennis Academy.

Twinning
 – Sankt Augustin, North Rhine-Westphalia, Germany (near Bonn, 57,000 population), twinned since 1980. The A52 relief road is named Sankt Augustin Way. Sankt Augustin has its  Grantham-Allee and "Grantham-Bridge".

Landmarks 

Grantham House is to the east of the church, and a National Trust property.

Grantham has the country's only "living" public house sign: a beehive of South African bees situated outside the Beehive Inn since 1830.

Grantham Guildhall on St Peter's Hill is now the Guildhall Arts Centre. Edith Smith Way is a road next to the Arts Centre, named after England's first policewoman. Mary Allen and Ellen F. Harburn reported for duty on 27 November 1914. Mary Allen was a former suffragette and had been previously arrested outside the House of Commons and later went on to be the commandant of the UK's women's police force from the 1920s up to 1940. She helped to set up women's police forces in other countries, including Germany. Edith Smith became the first female with powers of arrest in August 1915.

Sandon Road is named after Viscount Sandon, also the Earl of Harrowby. The first person with the title was Dudley Ryder, 1st Earl of Harrowby; a road is also named after him. He bought Harrowby Hall in 1754. The current owner is Dudley Ryder, 8th Earl of Harrowby.

The Blue Pig, one of many Blue pubs, stands in Vine Street, near the Church of St Wulfram. The building is one of probably only four remaining Tudor buildings in the town and a survivor of the disastrous fires of the 1660s. It was first mentioned as an inn in a trade directory of 1846, when the landlord was one Richard Summersby. The property was then owned by the Manners family (giving the derivation of Blue in the name).
 The nearby George Hotel (known as St Peter's Place, now the George Shopping Centre) was mentioned in Charles Dickens's novel Nicholas Nickleby. Many of the town's property and industrial estates have been owned by Buckminster Trust Estates since the time of the Earl of Dysart.

To the west of the town near the A607 is Baird's maltings, owned by Moray Firth until 1999 and before that by R & W Paul. Other maltings have been converted for residential use, such as Riverview Maltings near the river, formerly owned by Lee & Grinling's.

Grantham JobCentre was opened on 24 June 1975 by local MP Joseph Godber. Grantham and District Hospital stands next to the Priory Ruskin Academy on the A607 in the north of the town. The maternity unit opened in August 1972 is now a midwife-staffed unit.

Nearby are many historic houses including 17th-century Belton House (the Brownlows), early 19th-century Harlaxton Manor (the Gregorys), Stoke Rochford Hall (owned by the Turnors, and since 1978 a training centre of the NUT), and the 19th-century Belvoir Castle (the Manners), in Leicestershire. Much of the property and land to the south-west of the area is owned by the two estates of Belvoir and Buckminster. Further to the south of Stoke Rochford are the Cholmeleys of Easton Hall.

Notable people

Armed forces and police
Philip Knights, Baron Knights (1920–2014), police officer
Walter Richard Parker VC (1881–1936), Royal Marine awarded the Victoria Cross at Gallipoli
Edith Smith (1876–1924), first woman police officer with full arrest powers

Arts and entertainment
Antonio Berardi (born 1968), fashion designer
Judy Campbell (1916–2004), actor and playwright
Syd Cain (1918–2011), film production designer
Eric Chappell (born 1933), comedy writer
Colley Cibber (1671–1757), actor, playwright and poet laureate, attended The King's School, Grantham.
Dorothy Cowlin (1911–2010), novelist born in Grantham
Johnny Haddon Downes (1920–2004), television producer
Vince Eager (born 1940), singer
Graham Fellows (born 1959), actor and musician
Michael Garner (born 1954), actor
Holly Humberstone (born 1999), singer and songwriter
Henry Johnson (1806–1910), circus equestrian gymnast and acrobat
Jessie Lipscomb (1861–1962), sculptor
Nicholas Maw (1935–2009), composer
Richard Nauyokas (born 1962), soldier and actor
Nicholas Parsons (1923–2020), television and radio presenter
Roy Petley (born 1951), Grantham-born plein air painter
William Stukeley (1687–1765), antiquarian
Richard Todd (1919–2009) actor
Clare Tomlinson (born 1968), news presenter
Edward Crook (1988- ), actor
 Ady Suleiman (1992- ), singer songwriter

Crime
Beverley Allitt (born 1968), serial killer

Politics and philosophy
Mary Sophia Allen (1878–1964), suffragist, women's rights activist, and Nazi sympathizer
Sir John Brownlow, 3rd Baronet (1659–1697), politician and landowner
William Bury (c. 1605–1669), Commonwealth politician and army officer
William Cecil, 1st Baron Burghley (1520–1598), statesman and Secretary of State, attended the King's School.
Sir Clement Cotterell (died 1631), courtier and MP for Grantham
Sir John Cust (1718–1770), MP for Grantham (1743–1770) and Speaker of the House of Commons
Joseph Godber, Lord Godber (1914–1980), was Conservative MP for Grantham in 1951–1979 and held several government posts.
Douglas Hogg, Lord Hailsham (born 1945), was a Conservative politician and minister, and MP for Grantham (1979–1997).
Denis Kendall, MP for Grantham 1942–1950
John Mordaunt (died c. 1505), MP for Grantham in 1491 and Speaker of the House of Commons
Henry More (1614–1687), rationalist philosopher, attended The King's School.
Thomas Paine (1737–1809), political writer and revolutionary
Margot Parker (born 1943), UKIP MEP (2014–2019)
Sir Arthur Priestley (1865–1933), Liberal MP for Grantham (1900–1918)
Alderman Alfred Roberts (1892–1970), local politician
Nathaniel Ryder, 1st Baron Harrowby (1735–1803), politician
Norman Shrapnel (1912–2004), political correspondent and author
Margaret Thatcher (1925–2013), Conservative Prime Minister, daughter of Alfred Roberts
Thomas Witham (c. 1420–1489), Chancellor of the Exchequer to Henry VI and Edward IV

Religion

Frederic Barker (1808–1882), Anglican Bishop of Sydney, attended The King's School.
Tim Ellis (born 1953), Anglican suffragan Bishop of Grantham (2006–2013)
Arthur Greaves (1873–1960), Anglican suffragan Bishop of Grantham and later Grimsby
Gregory Hascard (died 1708), Anglican Dean of Windsor and religious writer
Dennis Hawker (1921–2003), Anglican suffragan Bishop of Grantham (1972–1987)
John Hine (1857–1934), Anglican bishop, successively of Nyasaland, Zanzibar, Northern Rhodesia and Grantham (1920–1930)
Welbore MacCarthy (1840–1925), Anglican Archdeacon of Calcutta, and later inaugural suffragan Bishop of Grantham (1905–1920)
Algernon Markham (1869–1949), Anglican suffragan Bishop of Grantham (1937–1949)
James McCann (1897–1983), Anglican Archbishop of Armagh and Primate of All Ireland
Anthony Otter (1896–1986), Anglican suffragan Bishop of Grantham (1949–1965)
John Still (1593–1608), Bishop of Bath and Wells, once thought to have written an early farce, Gammer Gurton's Needle
Doris Stokes (1920–1987), spiritualist and psychic medium
William Wand (1885–1977), Anglican prelate, successively Archbishop of Brisbane, Bishop of Bath and Wells and Bishop of London

Science and engineering

Charles Bell (1846–1899), architect
William Clarke (1609–1682), apothecary and tutor to Isaac Newton
Maxwell Hutchinson (born 1948), architect
Isaac Newton, (1642–1726/27), physicist and mathematician
Mark A. O'Neill (born 1959), biologist and computer scientist
Thomas James Smith (1827–1896), pharmacist and founder of the medical equipment firm Smith & Nephew

Sports
Shaun Balfe (born 1972), racing driver
Patrick Bamford (born 1993), professional footballer with Leeds United and the England national football team
Terry Bly (1935–2009), professional footballer, died in Grantham
Ian Bowyer (born 1951), professional footballer
Roderick Bradley (born 1983), American footballer
John Broughton (1873–1952), first-class cricketer

Charles P. Dixon (1873–1939), Olympic gold, silver and bronze medal-winning tennis player
Mathew Dowman (born 1974), first-class cricketer
Dave Gilbert (born 1963), professional footballer
Arthur Green (1885 – post-1912), professional footballer
Timothy Grubb (1954–2010), Olympic show jumper
Cyril Hatton (1918–1987), professional footballer
Richard Holmes (born 1980), professional footballer
Richard Howitt (born 1977), first-class cricketer
Vikki Hubbard (born 1989), international high jumper
Dickie Joynes (1877–1949), professional footballer
Alastair McCorquodale (1925–2009), Scottish athlete and first-class cricketer, died in Grantham.
Harry Pringle (1900–1965), professional footballer, died in Grantham.
Arnold Rylott (1839–1914), first-class cricketer
David Storer (born 1968), former cricketer
Simon Terry (1974–2021), Olympic Bronze medal-winning archer
Tom Wells (born 1993), first-class cricketer
William Woof (1858–1937), first-class cricketer
Ashley Wright (born 1980), first-class cricketer
Luke Wright (born 1985), first-class cricketer

See also
Blue pubs

References

Notes

Citations

Bibliography

Further reading
Historical overviews of some or all of Grantham's history can be found in:
Allen, Thomas, "Grantham soke and town", in Thomas Allen (ed.), The History of the County of Lincoln, from the Earliest Period to the Present Time, vol. 2 (London and Lincoln: John Saunders Jr, 1834), pp. 300–317
Couth, Bill (ed.), Grantham During the Interregnum: The Hall Book of Grantham, 1641–1649, The Publications of the Lincoln Record Society, no. 83 (Woodbridge: Boydell Press for the Lincoln Record Society, 1995)
Manterfield, John B., "The Topographical Development of the Pre-Industrial Town of Grantham, Lincolnshire 1535–1835" (unpublished Ph.D. thesis, University of Exeter, 1981)
Manterfield, John B. (ed.), Borough Government in Newton's Grantham: The Hall Book of Grantham, 1649–1662, The Publications of the Lincoln Record Society, no. 106 (Woodbridge: Boydell Press for the Lincoln Record Society, 2016)
Martin, G. H., The Royal Charters of Grantham 1463–1688 (Leicester: Leicester University Press, 1963)

Histories of more specific aspects of the town's history include:
Branson, S. J., A History of the King's School, Grantham (Gloucester: Alan Sutton, 1988)
Cartwright, Adam, "Mowbray and Co Ltd, Brewers of Grantham (1837–1952)", Lincolnshire History and Archaeology, vol. 49 (2017)
Crook, Ruth, The History of Vine House and Vine Street, Grantham (Grantham: Grantham Civic Society, 2014)
Kesteven and Grantham Girls' School, The History of Kesteven and Grantham Girls' School, 1910–1987 (Grantham: Kesteven and Grantham Girls' School, 1987)
Manterfield, John B., "Grantham Apothecaries: Further Notes", Lincolnshire History and Archaeology, vol. 25 (1990)
Manterfield, John B., "Edward Pawlett of Grantham: A Provincial Bookseller, 1660–1687", Lincolnshire History and Archaeology, vol. 29 (1994)
Pointer, Michael, Hornsbys of Grantham, 1815–1918 (Grantham: Bygone Grantham, 1976)
Pointer, Michael, The Glory of Grantham: Story of St Wulfram's Church (Grantham: Bygone Grantham, 1978)
Pointer, Michael, Ruston & Hornsby, Grantham, 1918–1963 (Grantham: Bygone Grantham, 1984)
Wilson, Catherine M., "Industrial Archaeology Notes", Lincolnshire History and Archaeology, vol. 12 (1977) – concerning Bjorlow Leather Works and Coles Cranes Factory
Wright, Neil R., Lincolnshire Towns and Industry 1700–1914, History of Lincolnshire, no. 11 (Lincoln: History of Lincolnshire Committee of the Society for Lincolnshire History and Archaeology, 1982)

Additionally, privately published works of a historical nature include Ruth Crook and Barbara Jeffries's The History of Little Gonerby and its School (Grantham: privately published, 2008) and The History of Gonerby Hill Foot and its School (Grantham: privately published, 2008). Collections of photographs include the Bygone Grantham series (6 vols; Grantham: Bygone Grantham, 1977–1987) edited by Michael Pointer and Malcolm Knapp. Knapp also compiled Grantham: The War Years, 1939–1945: A Pictorial Insight (Newland: Lincolnshire Books, 1995). Various collections of newspaper cuttings and excerpts under the title Grantham in the News by John R. Pinchbeck were published in five volumes between 1999 and 2010.

External links

Grantham tourist information, business services, community information, youth zone, news. – published by Kesteven District Council
Grantham Journal Newspaper
A Grantham directory

 
Towns in Lincolnshire
Market towns in Lincolnshire
Unparished areas in Lincolnshire
South Kesteven District